Lindor may refer to:
 
 Lindor (name), list of people with the name
 Lindor (card game), a popular French family game nowadays known as Nain Jaune
 A type of chocolate produced by Lindt & Sprüngli
 A character in the play The Barber of Seville

See also
 Linder (disambiguation)